Hopea cordifolia is a species of plant in the family Dipterocarpaceae. It is endemic to Sri Lanka.

Its wood is dark yellowish brown, very hard and heavy. It is capable of standing up to great transverse strains. It is durable and takes polish very well.

References

Flora of Sri Lanka
cordifolia
Endangered plants
Taxonomy articles created by Polbot